Jeffrey John "J. J." Wolf (born December 21, 1998) is an American professional tennis player. He achieved a career-high ATP singles ranking of world No. 39 on 13 February 2023. Wolf played collegiately at Ohio State University.

Early years
Wolf was born in Cincinnati, Ohio and attended Cincinnati Country Day School in Indian Hill, Ohio. He is the grandson of NBA basketball coach Charley Wolf.

In 2016, as the nation's third ranked recruit, he committed to playing collegiate tennis for the Ohio State Buckeyes.

On the junior tour, Wolf has a career-high ranking of No. 18 achieved on May 16, 2016.

College
In his first season, at Ohio State University, Wolf was named 2017 Big Ten Freshman of the Year and First-Team All Big Ten.

As of April 23, 2019 Wolf was the No. 1 ranked college player in the U.S.

In 2019, Wolf had a combined record of 45–3 between singles and doubles. On April 25, 2019, Wolf was named Big Ten Men's Tennis Athlete of the Year.

Career

2016–2017: Major doubles debut

Wolf made his Grand Slam main-draw debut at the 2016 US Open in the doubles event, partnering with John McNally. He received a wildcard to play in the men's singles qualifying competition for the 2017 US Open, but did not win a set.

2018: First top 100 win
On August 12, 2018, Wolf defeated world No. 85 Jozef Kovalik in the first round of qualifying at the 2018 Western and Southern Open in Mason, Ohio. Wolf won the match 7–6, 7–6. This upset marked Wolf's first win against an ATP top 100 player.

2019: Turning professional

Wolf began playing semi-pro tennis in 2016 and three years later, in July 2019, signed with Topnotch Management to play professionally. He turned pro after going 35–2 and earning Big Ten Player of the Year honors as a junior at Ohio State. 

On September 22, Wolf made it to the finals of the Columbus 3 Challenger event, losing to Peter Polansky. He beat fellow rising American Michael Mmoh in the round of 16 and top seed Emilio Gómez in the semifinals.

Wolf reached a career-high of No. 189 in the ATP singles rankings on November 18, 2019 after winning the 2019 Champaign Challenger, defeating Sebastian Korda in a tight two-and-a-half hour match. In January 2020 he started the year by winning the ATP Challenger Tour final in Nouméa, defeating Yuichi Sugita in the final.

2020: Top 150 & Major debut & third round at US Open

As of August 2020, Wolf won four Challenger titles and was victorious in three of his last five events dating back to the previous season. He was 14–2 with two titles during the first two months of 2020 before play was suspended due to the pandemic and made his top 150 debut on March 2, 2020 at World No. 144.

He qualified for the Western & Southern Open and was awarded a wildcard to the main draw at the 2020 U.S. Open. At the U.S. Open, Wolf defeated 29th-seeded Guido Pella of Argentina 6–2, 0–6, 6–3, 6–3 in the first round. Wolf went on to defeat Spain’s Roberto Carballés Baena 6–2, 6–4, 6–3 in round two, before losing in the third round to Russian Daniil Medvedev 6–3, 6–3, 6–2. Wolf is only the third Ohio State Buckeye to reach the third round at the US Open after Francisco González in 1980 and Roger Smith in 1994.

2021: Hiatus after hernia operations
In early 2021, Wolf underwent two hernia operations and could not compete for seven months.

2022: First two Masters wins & ATP final, US Open third round, top 60

Ranked 209th at the 2022 Abierto Mexicano Telcel in Acapulco, Wolf reached the second round as a qualifier after defeating World No. 21 Lorenzo Sonego. It was his first ATP win since the 2020 US Open and only the third of his career. 

At his next tournament in Indian Wells, Wolf, having qualified for the tournament again, beat Hugo Gaston in straight sets before losing in three sets to 15th seed Roberto Bautista Agut, despite having a match point in the third set. Wolf then reached the semifinals at the Phoenix Challenger, losing to eventual champion Denis Kudla. 
Wolf then qualified for Miami, and beat Daniel Altmaier in the first round. He lost in three sets to third seed and world No. 5 Stefanos Tsitsipas in the second round. 

He reached the top 100 at World No. 99 on 1 August 2022. Also in August, at the 2022 Citi Open, he reached the round of 16 after defeating 6th seed Denis Shapovalov. He reached an ATP 500 quarterfinal for the first time in his career after defeating 9th seed Holger Rune. The same day he lost in his quarterfinal match to top seed Andrey Rublev. As a result he moved up 15 positions to a new career-high of World No. 84 on August 8, 2022.

At the US Open he upset 16th seed Roberto Bautista Agut. Next he defeated Alejandro Tabilo to reach the third round for a second time at this Major. He lost to Nick Kyrgios in straight sets. As a result he moved into the top 75 in the rankings to a new career-high of No. 72 on September 12, 2022.

At the 2022 Firenze Open he reached his first ATP semifinal in his career by defeating fourth seed Maxime Cressy in the round of 16  and seventh seed Alexander Bublik in the quarterfinals. He defeated qualifier Mikael Ymer in the semifinals to reach the first final of his career which he lost in straight sets to Félix Auger-Aliassime. As a result he moved 20 positions up into the top 60 in the rankings at world No. 56 on October 17, 2022.

2023: Australian Open debut and fourth round, top 40 
At the 2023 Australian Open, Wolf reached the fourth round, defeating Jordan Thompson, 23rd seed Diego Schwartzman and Michael Mmoh before losing to fellow American Ben Shelton in five sets. Following this match, Wolf rose into the top 50 in the ATP rankings at world No. 48 on 30 January 2023.

Seeded sixth at the 2023 Dallas Open, he reached his second tour-level semifinal in his career after defeating qualifier Brandon Holt, Radu Albot and second seed Frances Tiafoe. As a result he moved into the top 40 in the rankings at No. 39 on 13 February 2023.
Seeded ninth at the 2023 Delray Beach Open, he lost in the round of 16 to Adrian Mannarino.

ATP career finals

Singles: 1 (1 runner-up)

ATP Challenger and ITF Futures finals

Singles: 7 (6–1)

Performance timeline

Singles
Current through the 2023 BNP Paribas Open.

Record against top 10 players
Wolf's record against those who have been ranked in the top 10, with those who are active in boldface. Only ATP Tour main draw matches are considered:

References

External links

 
 

1998 births
Living people
American male tennis players
Tennis people from Ohio
Ohio State Buckeyes men's tennis players